Anthony James Moxon Lowther-Pinkerton, LVO, MBE, DL (born 28 September 1960) is the former Private Secretary to the Duke and Duchess of Cambridge and to Prince Harry. He was appointed on 2 May 2005 and resigned as full-time Private Secretary with effect from September 2013, remaining for a single day a week in order to mentor and advise the younger staff who shall have to succeed him. 

From 1979 to 1998 he was an officer in the British Army, serving with the Irish Guards and the Special Air Service (SAS), including in the first Gulf War, and in Colombia and the Balkans.

He is godfather to Prince George.

Biography

Early life
Brought up in Alderton, Suffolk, he is descended from the Lowther landed gentry family, and shares a descent from the 1st Earl of Bessborough with his royal employers. He was educated at Eton College.

His first career was in the British Army. He trained at the Royal Military Academy, Sandhurst in 1979, and joined the Irish Guards. Lowther-Pinkerton served with the 1st Battalion Irish Guards, but was attached to the Special Air Service (SAS) throughout his 20-year army career, where he was described as an especially capable officer. He retired from the Army in 1998.

Career
He served as Equerry to Queen Elizabeth The Queen Mother 1984–1986, and was promoted to Captain on 8 June 1986. He was a troop commander of the SAS as a Captain. He served in the first Gulf War in 1990-1991 as Special Forces Liaison Officer with United States forces., 

He was promoted to the rank of Major on 30 September 1992, and was in charge of two 20-man SAS counter-narcotics operations in Colombia for two years in the early 1990s. He attended the Staff College, Camberley, and qualified as a staff officer (psc). Lowther-Pinkerton was Commanding Officer of G Squadron SAS. In the mid-to-late 1990s he was in the Balkans for the strategic policy review by the Ministry of Defence; reportedly in 1994 as part of a four-man SAS "Joint Communication Organisation" in Bosnia., 

In 2001 he co-founded and has since been a director of Objective Travel Safety, which provides risk assessment training for young travellers and journalists. He trained Ewan McGregor and Charley Boorman for their Long Way Round and Long Way Down TV series. He is a part-time consultant to Kroll Risk Management, London., 

He was appointed Member of the Royal Victorian Order (MVO) for his service as Equerry to The Queen Mother in 1986, Member of the Order of the British Empire (MBE) in 1990 for service with the special forces in Colombia, and Lieutenant of the Royal Victorian Order (LVO) in the 2013 New Year Honours. Until 2021 Lowther-Pinkerton served as a trustee for the veteran support and archaeology charity Waterloo Uncovered, which conducts excavations at the site of the Battle of Waterloo with veterans and serving personnel.

Personal life
He is married to Susannah Lowther-Pinkerton (born Susannah Lucy Richards) with four children. The family lives in Suffolk. His ten-year-old son, William "Billy" Lowther-Pinkerton, was one of the pageboys at the wedding of Prince William and Catherine Middleton in April 2011.

References

External links
 Michael Evans and Andrew Pierce. "SAS hero parachuted in for princes: Drug-busting officer who specialises in risk management to guard William and Harry" The Times, 4 March 2005.
Jim Gilchrist. "The Special Heir Service" The Scotsman 29 April 2005
Waterloo Uncovered.

1960 births
Living people
People educated at Eton College
People from Suffolk Coastal (district)
Graduates of the Royal Military Academy Sandhurst
Irish Guards officers
Lieutenants of the Royal Victorian Order
Members of the Order of the British Empire
Deputy Lieutenants of Suffolk
Special Air Service officers
Equerries
Military personnel from Suffolk
British Army personnel of the Gulf War